Stigmella alikurokoi is a moth of the family Nepticulidae. It is only known from Kyushu in Japan.

There are three generations or more per year.

The larvae feed on Rubus buergeri, Rubus phoenicolasius and Rubus palmatus var. coptophyllus. They mine the leaves of their host plant. The mine consists of a linear, long and slender gallery on the upper surface of the leaf. It sometimes runs along the leaf margin and the mid rib. It is greenish brown to brown with a dark brown central line of frass.

External links
Japanese Species of the Genus Stigmella (Nepticulidae: Lepidoptera)

Nepticulidae
Moths of Japan